Wow! Thailand (Thai Thueng Wow Thailand) (lit. Amazing Wow! Thailand), is a Thai travel television show hosted by Chatchawit Techarukpong (Victor), Nachat Juntapun (Nicky), Leo Saussay and Methavee Pichetchaiyuth (Now). It features stories and destinations throughout the 77 provinces across Thailand. Produced by GMMTV, the show premiered in Thailand on 1 July 2018 on GMM25.

Hosts

Current hosts 
 Chatchawit Techarukpong (Victor)
 Nachat Juntapun (Nicky)
 Leo Saussay
 Methavee Pichetchaiyuth (Now)

Former hosts 
 Note Chern-yim
 Jetrin Wattanasin (J Jetrin)
 Pimlada Chaiprichawit (Prae)
 Rungtham Pumseenil (Rung)
 Padueng Songsang (Jazz Chuanchuen)
 Pakk
 Chainon Chantem (Off)

References

External links 
 Wow! Thailand on GMM 25 website 
 ไทยทึ่ง Wow! Thailand on LINE TV
 GMMTV

GMM 25 original programming
Travel television series